The Bangsaen Street Circuit is a  motorsport circuit in Bang Saen, Chonburi. The circuit was opened in 2007 and it hosts Speed Festival once a year. Before hosting international events in 2017, the circuit was redeveloped by Apex Circuit Design.

Lap records

The official fastest race lap records at the Bangsaen Street Circuit are listed as:

Notes

References

Motorsport venues in Thailand